The Xiaguan Formation is a Turonian to Campanian geologic formation in Henan Province of China. Dinosaur remains are among the fossils that have been recovered from the formation.

Paleofauna 
 Baotianmansaurus
 Mosaiceratops
 Nanyangosaurus

See also 
 List of dinosaur-bearing rock formations
 List of stratigraphic units with few dinosaur genera

References

Bibliography 

  
 
 

Geologic formations of China
Upper Cretaceous Series of Asia
Cretaceous China
Turonian Stage
Santonian Stage
Campanian Stage
Ooliferous formations